This list of people associated with the London School of Economics includes notable alumni, non-graduates, academics and administrators affiliated with the London School of Economics and Political Science. This includes 55 past or present heads of state, as well as 18 Nobel laureates.

LSE started awarding its own degrees in its own name in 2008, prior to which it awarded degrees of the University of London. This page does not include people whose only connection with the university consists in the award of an honorary degree.

The list has been divided into categories indicating the field of activity in which people have become well known. Many of the university's alumni have attained a level of distinction in more than one field, however these appear only in the category which they are most often associated.

Government and politics

Heads of state or government

United Kingdom

Current members of the House of Commons

 Dan Carden, British MP 
 Richard Bacon, British MP
 Karen Buck, British MP
 Greg Clark, British MP, former Secretary of State for Levelling Up, Housing and Communities and Secretary of State for Business, Energy and Industrial Strategy 
 Yvette Cooper, British MP, former Secretary of State for Work and Pensions
 Mary Creagh, British MP
 Stella Creasy, British MP
 Margaret Hodge, British MP
 Margot James, British MP, former Minister of State for Digital and Creative Industries 
 Ranil Jayawardena, British MP
 Ed Miliband, British MP, former Leader of the Labour Party and Leader of the Opposition
 Maria Miller, British MP, former Secretary of State for Culture, Media and Sport 
 Bob Neill, British MP
 Christopher Pincher, British MP
 Stephen Pound, British MP
 Rachel Reeves, British MP
 David Rutley, British MP
 Andrew Selous, British MP
 Virendra Sharma, British MP
 Barry Sheerman, British MP

Current members of the House of Lords
 Waheed Alli, Baron Alli, media mogul
 Ros Altmann, Baroness Altmann, former Minister of State for Pensions 
 Virginia Bottomley, Baroness Bottomley of Nettlestone, former Secretary of State for National Heritage and Secretary of State for Health 
 Meghnad Desai, Baron Desai, development economist
 Kishwer Falkner, Baroness Falkner of Margravine
 Anthony Giddens, sociologist
 David Gold, Baron Gold
 Anthony Grabiner, Baron Grabiner, current Deputy High Court Judge
 Derry Irvine, Baron Irvine of Lairg, former Lord Chancellor 
 Mervyn King, Baron King of Lothbury, School Professor of Economics at the LSE; former Governor of the Bank of England 
 Richard Layard, Baron Layard, economist
 Spencer Livermore, Baron Livermore, former director of political strategy for British prime minister Gordon Brown 
 Peter Mond, 4th Baron Melchett
 Nick Markham, Baron Markham
 Bhikhu Parekh, Baron Parekh, political theorist
 Dave Prentis, Baron Prentis of Leeds, trade unionist
 Joyce Quin, Baroness Quin, Labour Party politician
 Patricia Rawlings, Baroness Rawlings, British MEP, former Chairman of the Council of King's College London 
 Maurice Saatchi, Baron Saatchi, founder of Saatchi and Saatchi
 Aamer Sarfraz, Baron Sarfraz, Conservative politician and businessman
 Peter Smith, Baron Smith of Leigh, former Executive Leader of Wigan Council 
 Glenys Thornton, Baroness Thornton, former Parliamentary Under-Secretary of State for Health
 Adair Turner, Baron Turner of Ecchinswell, former Chairman of the Financial Services Authority
 Guglielmo Verdirame, Baron Verdirame
 William John Lawrence Wallace, Baron Wallace of Saltaire, former Deputy Leader of the Liberal Democrats in the House of Lords
Minouche Shafik, Baroness Shafik of Camden and Alexandria, Director of the LSE (2017–present); former Deputy Governor of the Bank of England

Former members of Parliament
 Leo Abse, British MP, famous for legalisation of male homosexuality
 Douglas Allen, Baron Croham, former Head of the Home Civil Service
 Peter Archer, Baron Archer of Sandwell, former Solicitor General for England and Wales
 Charlotte Atkins, former Junior Minister
 Jackie Ballard, British MP, journalist and director general of the RSPCA
 Tony Banks, Baron Stratford, British MP and British Peer
 Sir Rhodes Boyson, British MP
 Annette Brooke, British MP
 Nick Clegg, former Deputy Prime Minister of the United Kingdom and Leader of the Liberal Democrats
 Francis Cockfield, Baron Cockfield, British Peer, former Cabinet Minister and former Vice-President of the European Commission
 Tim Collins, British MP
 Maureen Colquhoun, Britain's first openly lesbian MP
 Jim Cousins, British MP
 Jo Cox, British MP
 Edwina Currie, British MP, former Junior Minister
 Hugh Dalton, former Chancellor of the Exchequer
 Andrew Dismore, British MP
 Dick Douglas, British MP
 Sir Albert Edward Patrick Duffy, British MP, former Cabinet Minister and former President of the NATO Parliamentary Assembly
 Frank Dobson, British MP, former Cabinet Minister
 Helen Eadie, MSP
 Matthew Elliott, CEO of Vote Leave
 Barbara Follett, British MP
 Steve Gilbert, British MP
 Philip Gould, Baron Gould of Brookwood, political advisor
 Tom Greatrex, British MP
 Miranda Grell, former Labour Councillor known as the first person found guilty of making false statements under the Representation of the People Act 1983
 Judith Hart, Baroness Hart, former Cabinet Minister
 Mark Hoban, British MP
 Jane Hutt, Minister in the Welsh Assembly Government
 Sydney Irving, Baron Irving of Dartford, British MP
 Brian Jenkins, British MP
 Aubrey Jones, Minister; chairman of the National Board for Prices and Incomes
 Frank Judd, Baron Judd, former Minister of State for Foreign and Commonwealth Affairs and Minister for Overseas Development
 Syed Kamall, British MEP
 Ruth Kelly, British MP, former Cabinet Minister
 Arthur Latham, British MP
 Rachel Lomax, Permanent Secretary at the Department for Transport, Department for Work and Pensions, and the Welsh Office
 Roy Mason, Baron Mason of Barnsley, British Labour politician; former Secretary of State for Defence; former Secretary of State for Northern Ireland
 Dame Mavis McDonald, Permanent Secretary of the Cabinet Office
 Michael Meacher, Minister
 John Mendelson, British MP
 John Moore, Baron Moore of Lower Marsh, former Secretary of State for Health and Social Services and Secretary of State for Transport 
 Merlyn Rees, former Home Secretary
 Andrew Miller, British MP
 Doreen Miller, Baroness Miller of Hendon, British Peer
 Eric Ollerenshaw, British MP
 Marion Phillips, British MP
 Sir Ray Powell, British MP
 Reginald Prentice, Baron Prentice, Cabinet Minister
 Nancy Seear, Baroness Seear, former leader of the Liberal Party in the House of Lords
 Beatrice Serota, Baroness Serota, former Junior Minister
 Hartley Shawcross, Baron Shawcross, former Cabinet Minister
 Sir Richard Shepherd, British MP
 Donald Soper, Baron Soper, Methodist minister, socialist and pacifist
 John Stonehouse, former Minister
 Jo Swinson, British MP, former Leader of the Liberal Democrats 
 Ian Taylor, British MP
 Adam Tomkins, Member of the Scottish Parliament
 Rudi Vis, British MP
 Malcolm Wicks, Minister
 Jenny Willott, British MP, former Junior Minister
 David Winnick, British MP
 Anthony Wright, British MP
 Michael Young, Baron Young, academic and author of the 1945 Labour manifesto

Civil servants
 Sir John Beddington, UK Government Chief Scientific Adviser
 Sir Kenneth Berrill, chief economic adviser to the Treasury; Head of the Central Policy Review Staff
 John Bourn, former Comptroller and Auditor General 
 Sir John Burgh, director-general of the British Council
 Sir Sydney Caine, Financial Secretary of Hong Kong, director of the LSE
 Paul Corrigan, director of strategy and commissioning of the NHS London Strategic Health Authority
 Sir Jeremy Heywood, Cabinet Secretary and Head of the Home Civil Service
 Claus Moser, Baron Moser, director of the Central Statistical Office of the United Kingdom
 Dame Una O'Brien, Permanent Secretary Department of Health
 Vicky Pryce former Joint Head of the United Kingdom's Government Economic Service
 Sir David Ramsden, MSc Economics 1990, chief economic adviser to HM Treasury
 Tom Scholar, Permanent Secretary at HM Treasury
 Josiah Stamp, former Governor of the Bank of England

United States
 Elliott Abrams, Assistant Secretary of State in Reagan Administration; senior director of the National Security Council in Bush Administration
Donald Baer, White House Director of Communications and Strategic Planning in Clinton Administration
 Valerie Lynn Baldwin, Assistant Secretary of the Army (Financial Management and Comptroller), Bush Administration
 Michael Chertoff, United States Secretary of Homeland Security, Bush Administration; US Attorney, Bush Sr. and Clinton Administrations
 Colm Connolly, United States Attorney, Bush Administration
 Lauchlin Currie, White House Economic Adviser to President Franklin Delano Roosevelt
 Rosa DeLauro, Democratic Member of the US House of Representatives
 Leandra English, deputy director of the Consumer Financial Protection Bureau
 Edwin Feulner, President of the Heritage Foundation Think Tank
 William Gale, Council of Economic Advisers, Bush Administration
 Eric Garcetti, Mayor of Los Angeles
 Marc Grossman, U.S. Under-Secretary of State, Bush Administration; US Ambassador to Turkey, Clinton Administration; Special Advisor to the President on Near East Affairs, Carter Administration
 Orval H. Hansen, Republican Member of the U.S. House of Representatives
 Alice Stone Ilchman, Assistant Secretary of Education and Cultural Affairs under US President Jimmy Carter
 Bruce Jentleson, International Affairs Fellow, Council of Foreign Relations; Senior Foreign Policy Advisor to Vice President Al Gore
 Bruce Katz, former Chief of Staff, US Department of Housing and Urban Development; Vice President, Brookings Institution
 Vanessa Kerry, Democratic activist and daughter of Senator John Kerry (D-MA)
 Ron Kind, Democratic Member of U.S. House of Representatives
 Mark Kirk, Republican Member of the U.S. Senate
 Monica Lewinsky, former White House intern involved in a sex scandal with former President Bill Clinton
 Susan Lindauer, ex-Congressional aide accused of assisting Iraqi intelligence prior to the 2003 invasion
 Edward Luttwak, consultant to the US National Security Council, State Department and Defence Department; economist; historian; Senior Fellow at the Center for Strategic and International Studies
 James McGreevey, former governor of New Jersey
 Brad Miller, Member of the US House of Representatives
 Richard H. Moore, North Carolina state treasurer
 Daniel Patrick Moynihan, US Senator
 Ethan Nadelmann, founder and executive director of the Drug Policy Alliance
 Peter R. Orszag, Special Assistant to the President for Economic Policy, Senior Economist, Council of Economic Advisors, Clinton Administration; Fellow of the Brookings Institution; Professor, Georgetown University, Congressional Budget Office director, director designate Office of Management and Budget
 Jon Ossoff, US Senator for Georgia (elected 2021), MSc International Political Economy 2013
 Tan Parker, member of the Texas House of Representatives
 Alice Paul, American suffragist
 Richard Perle, Assistant Secretary of Defense, Reagan Administration; Chairman of Defense Department Advisory Committee, Bush Administration; fellow, American Enterprise Institute
 F. Whitten Peters, Secretary of the Air Force, Washington, D.C.
 David Rockefeller, former chairman, Chase Manhattan Bank; Chairman/Honorary Chairman, the Council on Foreign Relations; Chairman/Honorary Chairman, the Trilateral Commission, son of financer John D. Rockefeller Jr. and grandson of Standard Oil co-founder John D. Rockefeller
Max Rose (born 1986), US Congressman from New York's 11th congressional district, and US Army Bronze Star recipient.
 Pete Rouse, White House Chief of Staff, Obama Administration
 James Rubin, Assistant Secretary of State, Clinton Administration; lead foreign policy adviser to John Kerry campaign
 Robert Rubin, U.S. Treasury Secretary and director, National Economic Council, Clinton Administration; director of Goldman Sachs
 Rajiv Shah, USAID Administrator, Obama Administration
 Robert Shapiro, Under Secretary of Commerce for Economic Affairs, Clinton Administration; Fellow of Harvard University; Fellow of National Bureau of Economic Research
 Mona Sutphen, current White House Deputy Chief of Staff for Policy
 John Tower, U.S. Senator
 Sanford J. Ungar, President emeritus of Goucher College; director of Voice of America; member of Council on Foreign Relations
 Paul Volcker, chairman of Federal Reserve, Carter and Reagan Administrations; US Treasury Under-Secretary, Nixon Administration; President of the Federal Reserve Bank of New York
 David Welch, Assistant Secretary of State, Clinton Administration; US Ambassador to Egypt, Bush Administration
 Kimba Wood, U.S. Federal Judge; Attorney General nominee
 Dov Zakheim, Under-Secretary of Defense, Bush and Reagan administrations

Canada
 Ed Broadbent, leader of the New Democratic Party of Canada, 1975–1989
 John Crosbie, Lieutenant-Governor of Newfoundland and Labrador, former Cabinet minister
 Jean-Yves Duclos, Canadian Liberal MP, Canada's Minister of Families, Children and Social Development
 Brian Greenspan, barrister
 Hal Jackman, former Lieutenant-Governor of Ontario
 Michael Ignatieff, Leader of the Liberal Party, 2008–2011
 Joy MacPhail, former finance minister and deputy premier of British Columbia
 Marc Mayrand, chief electoral officer of Elections Canada, 2007–present
 David McGuinty, Member of Parliament, Liberal Party
 Catherine McKenna, Canadian Liberal MP, Canada's Minister of Environment and Climate Change
 Bill Morneau, Canadian MP, Canada's Minister of Finance, 2015–present
 Jacques Parizeau, Premier of Quebec, 1994–1996
 Svend Robinson, former Canadian MP; first openly gay Canadian politician in major political party
 Gregory Selinger, Premier of Manitoba, 2009–2016
 Mitchell Sharp, former Canadian Minister of Finance
 Paul Zed, Member of Parliament for Saint John, New Brunswick

Latin America and the Caribbean
 Eduardo Bhatia, President of the Senate of Puerto Rico
 Winston Dookeran, Trinidad and Tobago politician and economist
 Christiana Figueres, current head of the UNFCCC
 Martin Lousteau, Minister of economy and production, Argentina
 Luis Fernando Jaramillo Correa, former minister of foreign affairs and public works, Colombia.
 Shridath Ramphal, former Secretary-General of the Commonwealth
 Kamina Johnson Smith, current Minister of Foreign Affairs and Trade, Jamaica
 Edith Clarke (anthropologist)

Europe

 Georgios Alogoskoufis, former Minister for Economy and Finance, Greece
 Prince Amedeo of Belgium
 Annalena Baerbock, German politician, Co-Leader of Alliance 90/The Greens, first female Minister of Foreign Affairs of Germany
 Rubina Berardo, Member of the Portuguese Assembly of the Republic
 Frits Bolkestein, Dutch politician and former EU Commissioner
 Joe Bossano, Chief Minister of Gibraltar
 Lykke Friis, Minister for Climate and Energy, Denmark
 Prince Haakon Magnus, Crown Prince of Norway
 Patrick Janssens, Mayor of Antwerp (2003–2012); MP Flemish Parliament, chairman Flemish social democrats (SP) (1999–2003), Belgian MP Chamber of Representatives (2003–2004)
 Jan Kavan, former President of the United Nations General Assembly, member of the Czech Parliament, former Foreign Minister and Deputy Prime Minister of the Czech Republic
 Memli Krasniqi, Minister of Agriculture, Forestry and Rural Development of the Republic of Kosovo
 Ursula von der Leyen, former Minister of Defence, Germany, current President of the European Commission
 Jana Maláčová, former Minister of Labour and Social Affairs of the Czech Republic
 Ivan Mikloš, Minister of Finance of Slovakia
 Franz Neumann, first Chief of Research of the Nuremberg War Crimes Tribunal
 Érik Orsenna, former economist and advisor to François Mitterrand, member of the Conseil d'État and of the Académie française, 1988 Prix Goncourt
 Giorgos Papakonstantinou, former Minister for Finance of Greece
 Jacek Rostowski, Minister of Finance, Poland
 Jonas Gahr Støre, Leader of the Norwegian Labour Party and former Norwegian Minister of Foreign Affairs
 Zdeněk Tůma, Governor of Czech National Bank
 Kai Whittaker, member of the German Parliament
 August Zaleski, twice Minister of Foreign Affairs of the Republic of Poland
 Victor Habert-Dassault, Member of the French Parliament
 Markus Gstöttner, former deputy Chief of Staff and economic advisor to Sebastian Kurz, current Chief of Staff to Karl Nehammer

Africa
 Augustus Akinloye, Nigerian lawyer and politician, Chairman of defunct National Party of Nigeria
 Kader Asmal, South African politician and member of the African National Congress' Executive Committee
 Obafemi Awolowo, Nigerian independence leader, Fabian lawyer, human rights advocate
 Ibrahim Gambari, Under Secretary General for Political Affairs at the United Nations
 Jeanne Hoban, Anglo-Sri Lankan journalist, Trotskyist political activist and trade-unionist
 Aguinaldo Jaime, Deputy Prime Minister of Angola
 Michael Wamalwa Kijana, former vice-president of Kenya
Josina Z. Machel, women's rights activist
 Mac Maharaj, South African ANC politician, former Minister of Transport
 Bayo Ojo, past head of the Nigerian Federal Ministry of Justice
 Babatunji Olowofoyeku, Nigerian politician
 Yemi Osinbajo, vice-president of Nigeria
 Alex Quaison-Sackey, former foreign minister of Ghana
 Winston Tubman, Liberian diplomat and politician
 Shamsudeen Usman, Nigerian economist, technocrat and banker; Minister of National Planning and past Minister of Finance of Nigeria

Asia

B. R. Ambedkar, First Law Minister of India, political leader who was the chief architect of the Indian Constitution
 Lakshmi Kant Jha, Governor of Reserve Bank of India, Member of Parliament, Indian Ambassador to United States, Governor of Kashmir
 Leslie Goonewardene, Statesman, Trotskyist independence activist and founder of Sri Lanka's first political party, the Lanka Sama Samaja Party.
 Piyasvasti Amranand, Thailand's Energy Minister
Ferdinand Alexander “Sandro” Araneta Marcos III - Congressman of the 1st district of Ilocos Norte, eldest son of President Bongbong Marcos and First Lady Liza Araneta-Marcos, grandson of former President Ferdinand Marcos and former First Lady Imelda Marcos.
 Sonny Angara, Senator of the Philippines
 Khawaja Muhammad Asif, Defence Minister of Pakistan
 Makhdoom Khusro Bakhtiar, former Dy. Foreign Minister of Pakistan
 Jyoti Basu, 2nd longest serving Indian chief minister, Indian politician, Kolkata, West Bengal, India
 Audrey Eu, chairman of the Civic Party and former member of the Legislative Council of Hong Kong
 Feroze Gandhi, Indian-Parsi politician and journalist, former 'First Gentleman of India' (husband of PM Indira Gandhi)
 Hishammuddin Hussein, Malaysia's Minister of Defence
 Yang Jiechi, current member of the Politburo of the Chinese Communist Party, former Foreign Minister
 Sir Yuet Keung Kan, Hong Kong politician, banker and lawyer
 Khan Abdul Qayyum Khan, President of Pakistan Muslim League, 1st Chief Minister of N.W.F.P. Pakistan, former Industry Trade and Interior Minister of Pakistan
 Emily Lau, Hong Kong politician, member of the Legislative Council of Hong Kong
 Marvi Memon, Member National Assembly Pakistan
 Krishna Menon, former Indian Permanent Representative to the UN, Minister of Defence, and leading proponent of India's emancipation
 Ghazali Shafie, former Foreign Minister of Malaysia
 Marty Natalegawa, former Foreign Minister of Indonesia
 C. R. Pattabhiraman, Indian member of Parliament and Union Minister
 Emília Pires, former Minister of Finance of Timor-Leste
 Sajith Premadasa, Leader of the Opposition of Sri Lanka, Member of Parliament for Colombo District, Leader of the Samagi Jana Balawegaya, former Minister of Housing and Construction, former Minister of Samurudi Affairs and former Deputy Minister of Health
 Pramod Ranjan Sengupta, Marxist intellectual and member of Indian National Army
 Tharman Shanmugaratnam, Singapore's Finance Minister
 Juwono Sudarsono, Indonesian Minister of Defence
 Goh Keng Swee, former Deputy Prime Minister of Singapore, 1959–1984
 Tan Chuan-Jin, Singapore's Minister for Social and Family Development
 Kashmala Tariq, Member of the National Assembly of Pakistan
 Josephine Teo, Singapore's Minister in the Prime Minister's Office
 Fadli Zon, Former deputy speaker of the Indonesian People's Representative Council
 Melvyn Ong, Singaporean army general and the current Chief of Defence Force of the Singapore Armed Forces
 Raghav Chadha, Member of Parliament, Rajya Sabha from Punjab, India
 Jayant Chaudhary, Member of Parliament, Rajya Sabha from Uttar Pradesh, India

Australia and New Zealand
 Tim Barnett, Member of the Parliament of New Zealand
 Peter Coleman, journalist and conservative politician
 Bill Hastings, Chief Censor of New Zealand, judge
 Robert Hill, Defence Minister
 Christian Porter, Treasurer and Attorney-General of Western Australia
 Gordon Reid, Governor of Western Australia and Vice-Chancellor of the University of Western Australia
 Peter Shergold, Secretary of the Department of Prime Minister and Cabinet
 Stephen Smith, Foreign and Defence Minister
 Tim Watts, Labour MP

Middle East

 Sheikh Hamdan bin Mohammed Al Maktoum, Crown Prince of Dubai
 Princess Badiya bint Al Hassan, member of royal family of Jordan
 Yishai Be'er, General in the Israel Defense Forces and currently the President of the Israeli Military Court of Appeals
 Maxime Chaya, Lebanese sportsman, mountaineer, and explorer
 Kemal Derviş, former UNDP Administrator (Head) and former Minister of Finance of Turkey
 Rafi Eitan, leader of the Gil Party in Israeli Politics, lawmaker, former security
 Emre Gönensay, Minister of Foreign Affairs of Turkey in 1996
 Moshe Levi, Lieutenant General, was the 12th Chief of Staff of the Israel Defense Forces (IDF)
 Yitzhak Moda'i, Israeli politician who served as an MP for over 20 years
 Amnon Rubinstein, Israeli law scholar, politician, and columnist, Education Minister of Israel, 1993–1996

International organisations and ambassadors
 James Allan, British High Commissioner in Mauritius and ambassador to Mozambique
 Jon Allen, Canadian Ambassador to Israel, 2006–present
 Shlomo Argov, prominent Israeli diplomat, former Israeli ambassador to the United Kingdom
 Kader Asmal, South African politician and member of the African National Congress' Executive Committee
 William Macmahon Ball, Australian diplomat
 Rosemary Banks, New Zealand's Ambassador to the United Nations
 Philip Barton, British High Commissioner to Pakistan
 Francis Cockfield, Baron Cockfield, Cabinet Minister under Thatcher; Vice-President of the European Commission
 Andrei Dapkiunas, Belarusian Ambassador to Austria, former Deputy Minister of Foreign Affairs and Ambassador to the UN
 Nitin Desai, former UN Under-Secretary-General for Economic and Social Affairs
 Abul Fateh, Bangladesh diplomat
 Ibrahim Gambari, Under Secretary General for Political Affairs at the United Nations
 Ian Goldin, former Vice President of External Affairs, World Bank
 Jeffrey Goldstein, managing director, World Bank
 Wang Guangya, permanent representative of the People's Republic of China to the United Nations
 Robert Murray Hill, Australian Ambassador to the United Nations
 Genta H. Holmes, United States Ambassador to Australia, Clinton Administration; United States Ambassador to Namibia; Chief of Mission to Haiti and Malawi
 Robert E. Hunter, former U.S. Ambassador to NATO
 Clete Donald Johnson, Jr., former Member of Congress and US Ambassador, LL.M 1978
 Manoj Juneja, deputy director-general for operations, Food and Agriculture Organization of the United Nations
 Ahmad Kamal, Pakistani Ambassador to the UN
 Jan Kavan, former President of the United Nations General Assembly, member of the Czech Parliament, former Foreign Minister and Deputy Prime Minister of the Czech Republic
 Maliha Lodhi, Pakistan's High Commissioner to United Kingdom and former Ambassador to USA
 John J. Maresca, former US Ambassador to the OSCE in the George H.W. Bush Administration
 Sir Goolam Hoosen Kader Meeran, President of the UK Employment Tribunals; Judge of the United Nations Dispute Tribunal
 Braj Kumar Nehru, Ambassador of India to the United States and Indian High Commissioner to Britain
 Michael O'Neill, director of the Bureau of External Relations and Advocacy in the United Nations Development Programme (UNDP)
 William Peters, High Commissioner in Malawi
 Karen Pierce, current Permanent Representative of the United Kingdom to the United Nations
 Romano Prodi, President of the European Commission, 1999–2004
 Bertrand Ramcharan, UN High Commissioner for Human Rights
 Shridath Ramphal, former Secretary-General of the Commonwealth
 Shaha Riza, World Bank
 Pierre Sane, UNESCO's assistant director-general for Social and Human Sciences
 Michele J. Sison, US Ambassador to Lebanon in the Bush Administration
 Lachezara Stoeva, Permanent Representative of Bulgaria to the United Nations and President of the United Nations Economic and Social Council
 Walter Tarnopolsky, Canadian judge and member of United Nations Human Rights Committee
 Arne Roy Walther, Norwegian ambassador to Japan
 Michael Wilson, Canadian Ambassador to the US, 2006–present

Central bankers

 Tim Besley, economics professor and member of the Bank of England's Monetary Policy Committee
 Charlie Bean, economist, member of the Bank of England's Monetary Policy Committee
 Willem Buiter, economist, ex-member of the Bank of England's Monetary Policy Committee
 Nugget Coombs, Governor of the Reserve Bank of Australia
 Stanley Fischer, Governor of the Bank of Israel; former World Bank Chief Economist
 Neville Ubeysin-gha Jayawardena, Sri Lankan Sinhala economist, entrepreneur, and Senator; first indigenous governor of the Central Bank of Sri Lanka
 Stephen Nickell, economist, ex-member of the Bank of England's Monetary Policy Committee
 Amarananda Somasiri Jayawardene, Governor of the Central Bank of Sri Lanka
 Louis Rasminsky, Governor of the Bank of Canada, 1961–1973

Nobel laureates

Guy Medal (statistics) recipients
1945 Sir Maurice Kendall (Gold)
1976 James Durbin (Silver)
1978 Sir R. G. D. Allen (Gold)
1982 Henry Wynn (Silver)
2007 Howell Tong (Silver)
2008 James Durbin (Gold)

Academics

Economists

 Daron Acemoglu, economist, John Bates Clark Medal Winner 2005
 Sir Roy Allen, economist and mathematician
 Thomas Armbrüster, economist
 Heinz Wolfgang Arndt, economist
 Kaushik Basu, chief economist of the World Bank
 Peter Thomas Bauer, development economist
 William Baumol, professor of economics and director, C.V. Starr Center for Applied Economics, New York University
 Jo Beall,  professor of development studies
 Walter Berns, scholar, American Enterprise Institute
 Sir Tim Besley, economist
 Kenneth Binmore, economist
 Sir Richard Blundell, economist and econometrician
 Sir Alan Budd, British economist, provost of The Queen's College, Oxford
 Richard N. Cooper, Maurits C. Boas Professor of International Economics, Harvard University; previously chairman, National Intelligence Council and; Under Secretary of State for Economic
 Meghnad Desai, Baron Desai, development economist
 Ian Goldin, development economist, director of Oxford Martin School, University of Oxford
 Charles Goodhart, economist, ex-member of Monetary Policy Committee
 W. M. Gorman, economist
 Sir Theodore Gregory, British economist, economic adviser to the Government of India from 1938 to 1946
 Frank Hahn, economist
 David Forbes Hendry, British economist, currently professor of economics and head of the Economics Department at the University of Oxford
 J.A. Hobson, economist and writer
 Samuel Hollander, British/Canadian/Israeli economist
 Eliot Janeway, American economist, economic advisor to Presidents Franklin D. Roosevelt and Lyndon B. Johnson
 Harry Johnson, Canadian economist
 Lewis Webster Jones, economist, fifteenth President of Rutgers University
 Nicholas Kaldor, economist
 Peter Kenen, economist
 Maurice Kugler, development economist
 Ludwig Lachmann, economist
 David Laidler, economist
 Richard Layard, Baron Layard, economist
 Peter Leeson, George Mason Economist
 Patrick Minford, economist
 Michio Morishima, Japanese economist
 Abhinay Muthoo, economist
 Andrew Oswald, economist
 Maurice Peston, Baron Peston of Mile End, economist and politician
 Peter C. B. Phillips, Sterling Professor of Economics and Professor of Statistics at Yale University
 William Phillips, economist, inventor of the Phillip's Curve
 Arnold Plant, economist
 Thomas Piketty, economist, author of "Capital in the Twenty-First Century" Affairs
 Mihir Rakshit, economist
 Lionel Robbins, economist
 Tadeusz Rybczynski, Polish-born English economist, known for the development of the Rybczynski theorem
 Anthony Saunders, chairman, Department of Finance, Stern School of Business, New York University
 Tibor Scitovsky, economist
 Arthur Seldon, free market ideologue
 Andrew Sentance, member of Monetary Policy Committee
 G.L.S. Shackle, economist
 Neil Shephard, econometrician
 Alasdair Smith, economist, former Vice-Chancellor at the University of Sussex
 Piero Sraffa, economist
 Nicholas Stern, economist
 Paul Sweezy, Marxist economist
 Prajapati Trivedi, economist, First Secretary Performance Management to Government of India
 Sho-Chieh Tsiang, economist
 Adair Turner, Baron Turner of Ecchinswell, businessman, academic, chair of the UK Financial Services Authority
 Ralph Turvey, economist at the London School of Economics, HM Treasury, the Electricity Council and the National Board for Prices and Incomes
 John Van Reenen, economist, director of the Centre for Economic Performance at the London School of Economics
 Sushil Wadhwani, economist
 Sir Alan Walters, monetary economist
 Basil Yamey, industrial economist
 Allyn Abbott Young, economist
 Francesco Caselli, economist
 Richard Werner, banking economist
 Ricardo Reis, economist
 Friedrich August von Hayek, CH, FBA, winner of the 1974 Nobel Memorial Prize in Economic Sciences with Gunnar Myrdal for their work on money and economic fluctuations, and the interdependence of economic, social and institutional phenomen
 Sir John Richards Hicks - winner of the 1972 Nobel Memorial Prize in Economic Sciences with Kenneth J. Arrow for their pioneering contributions to general equilibrium theory and welfare theory

Economic historians

 Edwin Cannan, historian of economic thought, professor at LSE, 1895–1926
 Nick Crafts, professor of economic history at LSE, 1995–2005
 Kent Deng, East Asian economic historian
 Niall Ferguson, Philippe Roman Chair in History and International Affairs
 Mary S. Morgan, historian of economics
 R. H. Tawney, English writer; a leading advocate of Christian Socialism
 Donald Winch, professor of the history of economics at the University of Sussex
Eileen Power, second woman to be appointed to the Chair of Economic History
Lilian Knowles, First female professor of Economic History and first female Dean of Faculty, 1920s

Employment relations and management
 Chrisanthi Avgerou, chor of information systems
 Claudio Ciborra (1951–2005), chor of information systems

Historians
 Janet Coleman, historian of political thought
 Martin van Creveld, Israeli military historian and theorist
 James Joll, leading World War I historian
 Paul Kennedy, British historian specialising in international relations and grand strategy
 Alfred Marshall, historian and sociologist
 Desmond Morton, historian
 Sir Lewis Bernstein Namier, historian
 Rosemary O'Day, historian and author, Eileen Power student, 1970
 Ben Pimlott, Fabian President, modern historian, former president of the University of Nottingham
 A. L. Rowse, historian
 Sir Anthony Seldon, historian, biographer of Tony Blair and headmaster of Wellington College
 Avi Shlaim, historian specialising in the Middle East
 Alan Sked, leading Habsburg historian and founder of the United Kingdom Independence Party
 David Starkey, historian specialising in Tudor England
 G. E. M. de Ste. Croix, historian
 David Stevenson, World War One historian
 John Stubbs, historian, former president of Trent University and Simon Fraser University
 Jacob Talmon, historian
 Arnold Joseph Toynbee, historian
 Sir Charles Webster, Stevenson Professor of International History; diplomat and founder of the United Nations
 Odd Arne Westad, historian specialising in the Cold War and contemporary East Asian history

Human geography
 Harold Brookfield (PhD 1950), emeritus professor, Australian National University
 George Jonas, founder of social geography; professor of geography at LSE, 1958–1983
 Halford MacKinder, geographer and LSE director, 1903–1908
 Laurence Dudley Stamp, geographer

International relations
 Daniele Archibugi, former visiting professor of international relations
 Coral Bell, reader in international relations, 1965–1972
 Hedley Bull, professor of international relations
 Barry Buzan, professor of international relations
 Michael Cox, professor of international relations
 Sara Hagemann, assistant professor at LSE's European Institute
 David Held, professor of international relations
 Fred Halliday, professor of international relations (Montague Burton Chair), to 2008
 Kimberly Hutchings, professor of international relations
 Mary Kaldor, professor of international relations
 Parag Khanna, specialist in geopolitics and globalisation, managing partner of FutureMap and former managing partner of Hybrid Reality as well as Co-Founder & CEO of Factotum
 F. S. Northedge, former professor of international relations
 Richard W. Lyman, former provost and president of Stanford University; founder of Stanford Institute for International Studies
 Susan Strange, professor of international relations (Montague Burton Chair), 1978–1988
 Leonard Suransky, winner of Des Lee Visiting Lectureship in Global Awareness at Webster University
 Martin Wight, reader in international relations, 1949–1960

Law
 Andrew Ashworth CBE QC, Vinerian Professor of English Law at the University of Oxford
 Janice R. Bellace, Samuel A. Blank Professor of Legal Studies and Business Ethics, University of Pennsylvania, founding president of the Singapore Management University
 Aminullah Chaudhry, Pakistan bureaucrat and remained Principal Secretary to Prime Minister (PSPM) of Pakistan Malik Meraj Khalid and director general (DG), Civil Aviation Authority (CAA)
 Paul Davies, Cassel Professor of Commercial Law at the London School of Economics, Honorary QC
 Talbot "Sandy" D'Alemberte, former president of the American Bar Association, and former president of the Florida State University
 Albert Venn Dicey, English jurist
 Joseph Grundfest, W. A. Franke Professor of Law and Business, Stanford Law School
 Jeremy Horder FBA, former Law Commissioner for England and Wales, professor of law at Oxford University and the London School of Economics
 Sir Otto Kahn-Freund, professor of comparative law, University of Oxford, and a scholar in labour law
 Robert F. Kennedy Jr., son of politician Robert F. Kennedy, law professor at Pace University School of Law
 Sir David Hughes Parry, Professor of English law, 1930–1959
 Michael Zander QC, professor emeritus, Legal Correspondent of The Guardian newspaper, 1963–1988
 John Hart Ely, 10th Dean of Stanford Law School
J. A. G. Griffith FBA, Welsh legal scholar, Professor of Public Law at the London School of Economics, Chancellor of the University of Manchester
Nicola Lacey CBE FBA, professor of law, gender and social policy at the London School of Economics, professor of criminal law and legal theory at the University of Oxford
Julia Black CBE FBA, president-elect of the British Academy, strategic director of innovation and professor of law at the London School of Economics
Hugh Collins FBA, Vinerian Professor of English Law at the University of Oxford, former Head of the Law Department at the London School of Economics and general editor of the Modern Law Review
Conor A. Gearty FBA QC, Professor of Human Rights Law at the London School of Economics, founder member of the Matrix Chambers
Gerry Simpson, chair in Public International Law at the London School of Economics, professor of law at the University of Melbourne
Robert Carnwath, Lord Carnwath of Notting Hill, Visiting Professor in Practice at the Grantham Research Institute at the London School of Economics, former Justice of the Supreme Court of the United Kingdom
Ewan McKendrick QC, Herbert Smith Professor of English Private Law at the University of Oxford, Registrar of the University of Oxford
Neil Duxbury FBA, Professor of English Law at the London School of Economics
Dame Sarah Elizabeth Worthington, DBE, QC (Hon), FBA, FRSA, Pro-Director of the London School of Economics (with responsibility for research and external relations) between 2005 and 2010, Deputy High Court Judge in the Chancery Division
Sir Nigel Simon Rodley, KBE, Professor of Law and Chair of the Human Rights Centre, University of Essex, Member of the UN Human Rights Committee between 2001-2016
Martti Koskenniemi, Centennial Professor at the Law Department of the London School of Economics, Professor of International Law in the University of Helsinki and Director of the Erik Castrén Institute of International Law and Human Rights
Antony T. Anghie, law professor at the National University of Singapore Faculty of Law and Secretary-General of the Asian Society of International Law
Raymond Wacks, Emeritus Professor of Law and Legal Theory and Head of Department of Law (1986-1993), University of Hong Kong

Linguists
 Geoffrey Sampson, linguist

Philosophers

 Joseph Agassi, philosopher
 Brian Barry, moral and political philosopher
 William Warren Bartley, philosopher
 John Lane Bell, mathematical logician
 Kenneth Binmore, philosopher, economist and mathematician
 Nick Bostrom, philosopher
 Luc Bovens, philosopher
 Craig Callender, philosopher
 Nancy Cartwright, philosopher of science
 Sir Bernard Crick, political philosopher
 Helena Cronin, Darwinist philosopher
 Gregory Currie, philosopher
 Daniel Dennett, philosopher and cognitive scientist

 Paul Feyerabend, philosopher
 Peter S. Fosl, philosopher
 Ernest Gellner, philosopher
 John Gray, political philosopher
 Horace Romano Harré, philosopher
 Colin Howson, philosopher
 Chandran Kukathas, political theorist
 Imre Lakatos, philosopher of science
 Christian List, philosopher
 Shirley Robin Letwin, political philosopher
 David Makinson, philosopher and mathematical logician
 Nicholas Maxwell, philosopher
 David Miller, philosopher
 Alan Musgrave, philosopher
 Michael Oakeshott, philosopher
 Samir Okasha, philosopher of science
 Michael Otsuka, moral and political philosopher
 Sir Karl Popper, philosopher
 Graham Priest, philosopher
 Wlodek Rabinowicz, philosopher
 Eric Scerri, philosopher of chemistry
 Jeremy Shearmur, philosopher
 Elliott Sober, philosopher of biology
 Jeremy Stangroom, philosopher
 John Worrall, philosopher of science

Political scientists

 Benjamin Barber, professor of political science, University of Maryland, College Park
 Sir Ernest Barker, political scientist, Principal of King's College London, 1920–1927
 Scott Barrett, professor of political science at Johns Hopkins University
 Sarah Gibson Blanding, Vassar College's sixth president and first female president
 Verity Burgmann, professor of political science, University of Melbourne
 Satyabrata Rai Chowdhuri, political scientist, diplomat and author
 William Christian, political scientist at the University of Guelph
 Alasdair Cochrane, political theorist and ethicist, Professor of Political Theory at the University of Sheffield
 Ivor Martin Crewe, political scientist, Vice-Chancellor of University of Essex
 Sir Bernard Crick, political theorist
 Marianne Githens, American political scientist, feminist, author, and Elizabeth Conolly Todd Distinguished Professor of Goucher College
 Amy Gutmann, political scientist, President of the University of Pennsylvania
 James Jupp AM, British-Australian political scientist and author
 Harold Laski, political scientist and economist, colleague of Albert Einstein
 Jim Leach, John L. Weinberg Visiting Professor of Public and International Affairs at the Woodrow Wilson School of Princeton University
 Steven Lukes, political and social theorist
 Shireen Mazari, political scientist from Pakistan
 Ralph Miliband, political scientist
 Margaret Moore, political theorist
 Brendan O'Leary, Irish political scientist, Lauder Professor of Political Science at the University of Pennsylvania
 Bhikhu Parekh, Baron Parekh, political theorist
 Louis Pauly, political scientist
 William A. Robson, lecturer and professor of public administration, London School of Economics
 Gordon Smith, professor of politics and government, London School of Economics
 Jill Vickers, political scientist
 Ken Young, UK public policy and politics of the early Cold War, King's College London

Sociologists

 Peter Abell, founding director of Interdisciplinary Institute of Management
 Helmut Anheier, founder of the Centre for Civil Society and Dean of the Hertie School of Governance
 Eileen Barker, sociology of religion
 Zygmunt Bauman, Polish-born sociologist
 Ulrich Beck, sociologist
 Robin Blackburn, sociologist
 Tessa Blackstone, educationalist
 Stanley Cohen, sociologist
 Peter Davis, sociologist
 Norbert Elias, leading sociologist
 Anthony Giddens, sociologist renowned for his theory of structuration, and former director of the school
 Paul Gilroy, sociologist
 Jocelyn Hyslop, social worker and educator
 Ernest Krausz (1931-2018), Israeli professor of sociology and president at Bar Ilan University
 Michael Mann, sociologist
 Karl Mannheim, sociologist
 Robert McKenzie, sociologist and psephologist
 José Guilherme Merquior, sociologist and literary critic
 Andrew Milner, sociologist of literature
 Talcott Parsons, sociologist
 John Porter, sociologist
 Nikolas Rose, sociologist
 Saskia Sassen, sociologist and economist
 Mike Savage, sociologist
 Richard Sennett, sociologist
 France Winddance Twine, sociologist
 Hilary Wainwright, sociologist

Social anthropology

 Laura Bear, anthropologist
 Maurice Bloch, marxist and cognitive anthropologist
 Fredrik Barth, anthropologist
 Jean Comaroff, anthropologist
 John Comaroff, anthropologist
 Maria Czaplicka, Polish cultural anthropologist
 Jack Herbert Driberg, anthropologist
 E.E. Evans-Pritchard, anthropologist
 Sir Raymond Firth, ethnologist, founder of economic anthropology
 Rosemary Firth, ethnologist
 Meyer Fortes, anthropologist
 Alfred Gell, anthropologist
 David Graeber, anthropologist, anarchist and activist
 Deborah James, anthropologist
 Phyllis Kaberry, anthropologist
 Adam Kuper, anthropologist
 David Lan, anthropologist and film maker
 Edmund Leach, anthropologist
 Charles Stafford, anthropologist
 Alan Macfarlane, social anthropologist and historian
 Lucy Mair, anthropologist
 Harvey Whitehouse, cognitive anthropologist
 Bronisław Malinowski, anthropologist
 Z.K. Mathews, prominent Apartheid-era South African academic
 Ashley Montagu, anthropologist
 Hortense Powdermaker, anthropologist and ethnographer
 Philip Proudfoot, anthropologist and politician
 Alfred Radcliffe-Brown, anthropologist
 Audrey Richards, anthropologist, nutritional anthropologist
 Charles Gabriel Seligman, ethnographer
 Isaac Schapera, anthropologist
 Dan Sperber, anthropologist
 Michael Taussig, prominent 'postmodern' anthropologist
 Lionel Tiger, Charles Darwin Professor of Anthropology at Rutgers University
 Edward Westermarck, anthropologist
 Fei Xiaotong, anthropologist

Social policy analysts and workers

 William Beveridge, former director of LSE
 Winifred Cavenagh, Professor of Social Administration and Criminology at Birmingham University
 Julian Le Grand, Richard Titmuss Professor of Social Policy, senior advisor to Prime Minister Tony Blair
 Martin Knapp, Chair of LSE Health and Social Care
 Jane Lewis, Professor Emeritus of Social Policy 
 Tim Newburn, professor of criminology and current president of the British Society of Criminology
 Augustus Nuwagaba, associate professor at Makerere University
 Peter Townsend, professor of social policy
 Richard Titmuss, founder of the academic discipline of social policy
 Emily Grundy, Professor of Demography
 Roger Zogolovitch, architect and developer, director of the Infrastructure and Development course (1998-2003)

Social psychology
 Martin Bauer, psychologist
 Howard Gardner, American psychologist, best known for his theory of multiple intelligences
 Nicholas Humphrey, psychologist
 Satoshi Kanazawa, evolutionary psychologist
 J. Philippe Rushton, psychologist
 Geoffrey Miller, evolutionary psychologist
 Andrew Samuels, psychologist
 Graham Wallas, social psychologist, educationalist, and a leader of the Fabian Society
 Paul Webley, director and principal of the School of Oriental and African Studies, University of London

Statisticians
 Sir R. G. D. Allen, President of the Royal Statistical Society
 D. J. Bartholomew, Professor of Statistics and President of the Royal Statistical Society, 1993–1995
Daasebre Oti Boateng, Ghanaian Government statistician and head of the Statistical Service from 1982 to 2000, first black Chairman of the United Nations Statistical Commission in 1987
 Sir Arthur Bowley, statistician
 D. G. Champernowne, Professor of Statistical Economics
 W. Edwards Deming, statistician, economist
 Sir Ian Diamond, statistician, Principal and Vice-Chancellor of the University of Aberdeen
 James Durbin, statistician, econometrician
 John Hajnal, statistician
 W.D. Hamilton, mathematical biologist and demographer
 Sir Maurice George Kendall, statistician
 Leslie Kish, American statistician
 John Denis Sargan, statistician
 Nate Silver, American statistician
 Howell Tong, statistician
 Henry Wynn, President of the Royal Statistical Society in 1977

Arts and media

Film, music and performance

 Sylvia Anderson (nee Thamm), producer, writer, voice actor
 Greg Barker, documentary filmmaker, director of Ghosts of Rwanda
 Rhian Benson, Ghanaian and Welsh soul and jazz singer-songwriter
 Ralph Brown, actor, writer (Withnail & I, Alien3, Wayne's World 2)
 Mika, Beirut-born British/American singer
 Sophie Choudry, Indian actress
 Mick Jagger, British musician, lead vocalist of the Rolling Stones
 Angelina Jolie, film actress and activist
 Jules O'Riordan (aka Judge Jules), Radio 1 DJ
 Soha Ali Khan, Indian actress
 Katell Keineg, singer/songwriter
 Arif Mardin, Turkish music producer
 Metis, American musician
 Arnon Milchan, Israeli independent Hollywood film producer who has been linked to Mossad
 Ron Moody, British actor, famous for playing Fagin in Oliver!
 Jaime Murray, actress
 Scott Neustadter, Hollywood writer; 500 Days of Summer is based on a romance at LSE
 Mat Osman, bass player for Suede
 Edward R. Pressman, film producer (Wall Street, Das Boot, Thank You for Smoking)
 David Rodigan, reggae DJ
 Allan Segal, BAFTA-winning documentary film maker
 Tara Sharma, Indian actress
 Sophie Solomon, British violinist, songwriter and composer
 Robin Spry, filmmaker
 Frank Turner, musician, in the band Million Dead, now a solo artist; wrote his final year dissertation while on tour with Million Dead
 Oliver Weindling, jazz promoter and founder of the Babel jazz record label
 Frederick M. Zollo, Academy Award-nominated producer

Television and radio

 David Attenborough, BBC presenter and naturalist
 Zeina Awad, reporter, TRT WORLD
 Jana Bennett, Head of Vision, BBC
 Bidisha, broadcaster and writer
 Jon Blair, Academy Award, British Academy Award and Emmy-winning producer and director
 Josh Chetwynd, baseball presenter
 Gary Delaney, stand-up comedian
 Martin Durkin, TV director
 Loyd Grossman, TV chef/presenter
 Robert Kilroy-Silk, TV presenter, politician and Eurosceptic former MEP
 Hari Kondabolu, stand-up comedian
 Martin Lewis, TV presenter and money saving expert
 Sean McGuiness, Top Gear producer
 James O'Brien, radio journalist
 Mark Urban, Newsnight diplomatic editor
 Huw Wheldon, former MD of BBC TV

Authors and journalists

 Edith Abbott, author and social worker, Carnegie Postgraduate Fellowship 1906
 Eric Alterman, Professor of English at Brooklyn College; political columnist for The Nation
 Anne Applebaum, journalist and author
 Pat Barker, author, historian
 Peter Bart, journalist and film producer
 Sally Belfrage, journalist and author
 Julia Belluz, senior health correspondent for Vox
 Melissa Benn, journalist and feminist
 Owen Bennett-Jones, BBC World Service journalist
 Josh Chetwynd, baseball presenter, player and writer
 Andrew Coyne, national editor for Maclean's
 Rhian Edwards, poet
 Robert Elms, radio presenter, music journalist
 Ekow Eshun, BBC Newsnight broadcaster, and TV host
 Simon Garfield, The Observer journalist; author of Mauve and Our Hidden Lives
 Tom Happold, editor of The Guardian
 Maajid Nawaz, author and activist
 Leslie Finer, British journalist and author
 Daniel Finkelstein, Comment Editor of The Times
 Yvonne Green, poet, writer, barrister
 Edward Greenspon, editor-in-chief of The Globe and Mail newspaper
 Tim Judah, journalist and author
 Judith Hare, Countess of Listowel, journalist and author
 John Honderich, former publisher of the Toronto Star
 Robert Kaiser, American author and journalist
 Parag Khanna, author
 To Kit (real name: Chip Tsao), Hong Kong-based columnist-broadcaster
 Naomi Klein, author of No Logo and The Shock Doctrine
 Robert Kuttner, journalist and economics author
 Kirsty Lang, broadcaster and journalist
 Philippe Legrain, British journalist and writer
 Bernard Levin, journalist, author and broadcaster
 Michael Lewis, best selling author; contributing writer to the New York Times Magazine and Bloomberg
 Rod Liddle, journalist, TV presenter, former editor of BBC Radio 4's Today programme
 Tim Lott, journalist and Whitbread Book Awards-winning author
 Edward Lucas, journalist
 Tinius Nagell-Erichsen, Norwegian publisher of Aftenposten and Verdens Gang
 Hilary Mantel, writer, Man Booker Prize winner in 2009 and 2012, the first woman to receive the award twice
 Kingsley Martin, former editor of the New Statesman
 China Miéville, writer, PhD International Relations 2001
 Keith Murdoch, journalist and the father of Rupert Murdoch
 Yvonne Ndege, journalist
 Peter Pomerantsev, journalist
 Nisha Pillai, BBC World presenter
 Aroon Purie, Indian media mogul; founding editor and editor in chief of India Today and chairman of TV Today Network Limited
 Nabila Ramdani, French-Algerian journalist
Christopher Ruddy, journalist, CEO of Newsmax Media, formerly with the New York Post and Pittsburgh Tribune-Review
 Sadeq Saba, BBC Iranian affairs analyst
 Edward Taylor Scott, journalist, former editor and co-owner of The Guardian
 Barbara Serra, journalist and TV news reader
 Joss Sheldon, author
 Zecharia Sitchin, ancient astronaut theorist
 Michael Whitney Straight, publisher and novelist
 Mitchell Symons, journalist and author
 Paul Tansey, economics editor for The Irish Times
 Sander Vanocur, journalist, NBC
 Siddharth Varadarajan, journalist and editor
 Stuart Varney, Peabody Award-winning economic journalist
 Justin Webb, BBC News, Washington Correspondent
 Jacqueline Wheldon, novelist
 Xu Zhimo, early 20th-century Chinese poet

Pulitzer Prize winners

Business and finance

 Josef Ackermann (born 1948), former CEO of Deutsche Bank (visiting professor)
Aigboje Aig-Imoukhuede, banker, cofounder Access Bank Plc and Founder & Chairman, Africa Initiative for Governance
 Ameer Ali, economist, President of the Australian Federation of Islamic Councils
 Marco Alverà, CEO of Snam
 Delphine Arnault, billionaire French businesswoman
 Sir Terence Beckett, chairman of Ford and director-general of the Confederation of British Industry
 Geoffrey Bell, banker, and Group of Thirty founder
 Alan Blinder, chief economist of the Council of Economic Advisors under Bill Clinton; economic advisor to John Kerry; vice-chairman of the Federal Reserve Board of Governors; professor of economics, Princeton University
 Sir Gordon Brunton, Chief Executive of Thomson Corporation, former Chairman of Sotheby's
 Richard Caruso, founder and Chairman of Integra LifeSciences Corporation; 2006 Ernst & Young US Entrepreneur of the Year
 Glyn England, chairman of the Central Electricity Generating Board
 Tony Fernandes, entrepreneur
 Clara Furse, former Chief Executive of the London Stock Exchange
 Sir Stelios Haji-Ioannou, entrepreneur, founder of EasyGroup
 Michael S. Jeffries, CEO of Abercrombie & Fitch Co.
Jonathan Kestenbaum, Baron Kestenbaum (born 1959), chief operating officer of investment trust RIT Capital Partners plc, and a Labour member of the House of Lords
 Spiro Latsis, billionaire
 Charles Lee, former chairman of the Hong Kong Stock Exchange
 Catherine Maxwell Stuart, 21st Lady of Traquair, brewer, hotelier, and estate owner
 David Morgan, CEO of Westpac
 Arif Naqvi, CEO of The Abraaj Group, a private equity firm
 Erling Dekke Næss, Norwegian shipowner and businessman
 Richard Nesbitt, CEO, TSX Group; Toronto Stock Exchange
 Jorma Ollila, Chairman of Nokia Corporation, Non-executive chairman of Royal Dutch Shell
 Zarin Patel, BBC's Chief Financial Officer
 Gary Perlin, CFO Capital One Financial Corporation; Former CFO World Bank
 Avinash Persaud, Global Head of Currency & Commodity Research at J.P. Morgan
 Ruth Porat, Chief Financial Officer, Alphabet Inc, former Chief Financial Officer, Morgan Stanley
 Vicky Pryce, former Joint Head of the UK Government Economic Service
 Philip J. Purcell, former CEO Morgan Stanley Dean Witter
 Syed Ali Raza, President and Chairman of the National Bank of Pakistan
 David Rockefeller, former chairman, Chase Manhattan Bank; Chairman/Honorary Chairman, the Council on Foreign Relations; Chairman/Honorary Chairman, the Trilateral Commission, son of financer John D. Rockefeller Jr. and grandson of Standard Oil co-founder John D. Rockefeller
 Maurice Saatchi, Baron Saatchi, founder of Saatchi and Saatchi
 Allen Sheppard, Baron Sheppard of Didgemere, industrialist, Chancellor of Middlesex University
 George Soros, financier; billionaire
 Peter Sutherland, BP and Goldman Sachs chairman

 Sheikha Alanoud bint Hamad Al Thani, finance executive at the Qatar Financial Centre
 Gordon Thiessen, Governor of the Bank of Canada, 1994–2001
 Yevhenia Tymoshenko, Ukrainian entrepreneur and lobbyist on behalf of her mother, former Prime Minister of Ukraine Yulia Tymoshenko
 Lance Uggla, CEO of Markit Group
 Panagis Vourloumis, managing director and President of the OTE's Board, the national telecommunications provider of Greece
 Arnold Weinstock, Baron Weinstock, English businessman best known for building GEC
 Jim Whitehurst, CEO of Red Hat
 Jeff Wooller, accountant and educationalist
 Rebekah Yeoh, Malaysian businesswoman and philanthropist

Law enforcement
 Sir Ian Johnston, Chief Constable of British Transport Police
 Valerie Plame, CIA officer who was controversially identified in a newspaper column by Robert Novak in July 2003
 Barbara Wilding, Chief Constable of South Wales Police

Lawyers and judges

 Kweku Etrew Amua-Sekyi, Justice of the Supreme Court of Ghana and Justice of the Supreme Court of the Gambia
 Cherie Blair QC, judge, wife of former British Prime Minister Tony Blair
 Gerald Butler, senior judge at Southwark Crown Court
 Colm Connolly, Judge of the United States District Court for the District of Delaware
 Yoram Danziger, Justice of the Supreme Court of Israel
 Dame Linda Dobbs, first non-white person to be appointed a judge of the High Court of Justice of England and Wales
 Courtenay Griffiths, QC
 Curtis Doebbler, lawyer, represented Saddam Hussein
 Sir Richard Field, High Court Judge
 Sir Morris Finer, barrister, judge, Chairman of the Finer Report on One Parent Families & the Royal Commission on the Press, Vice Chairman of Governors of LSE
 Sir Michael Fox, Lord Justice of Appeal
 Dame Janet Gaymer QC, Civil Service Commissioner and Commissioner for Public Appointments
 Anthony Grabiner, Baron Grabiner, Deputy High Court Judge
 Sir Christopher Greenwood QC, advised Tony Blair and the Bush Administration on the legality of the Iraq War, member of the International Court of Justice
 Bill Hastings, Chief Censor of New Zealand
 Dame Rosalyn Higgins QC, judge and former president of the International Court of Justice
 Sir Robin Jacob, as Lord Justice Jacob a Lord Justice of Appeal in the Court of Appeal of England and Wales
 Sir Edwin Jowitt, High Court Judge
 Makhdoom Ali Khan, former Attorney General of Pakistan
 Salahuddin Ahmad, former Attorney General of Bangladesh
 Anthony Kennedy, U.S. Supreme Court, Associate Justice
 Manfred Lachs, judge on the International Court of Justice
 Sir Hersch Lauterpacht, Judge of the International Court of Justice
 Mustafa Kamal, former Chief Justice of Bangladesh
 Lauretta Lamptey, Ghanaian Commissioner on Human Rights and Administrative Justice
 D. Price Marshall Jr., Judge of the United States District Court for the Eastern District of Arkansas
 Jeremy McMullen, QC, judge at the High Court, the Employment Appeal Tribunal and Southwark Crown Court
 Thomas Mesereau, lawyer, represented Michael Jackson
 Dorab Patel, Justice of the Supreme Court of Pakistan
 Gareth Peirce, solicitor, represented the Guildford Four
 Robert Ribeiro, Permanent Justice of the Hong Kong Court of Final Appeal
 Walter Tarnopolsky, Canadian judge and member of United Nations Human Rights Committee
 Cedric Thornberry, International lawyer and former Assistant-Secretary-General of the United Nations
 Mónica Feria Tinta, international lawyer, obtained the first international human rights court decision ordering the prosecution of a former Head of State for crimes under international law; co-recipient of Gruber Justice Prize 2007
 Peter Whiteman, Deputy High Court Judge
 Christopher Wolf, American attorney, pioneer in Internet law
 Kimba Wood, federal judge on senior status for the United States District Court for the Southern District of New York
 John A. Woodcock Jr., Judge of the United States District Court for the District of Maine
Derry Irvine QC, Baron Irvine of Lairg, Scottish lawyer and judge, former Lord High Chancellor of Great Britain, founder of the 11 King's Bench Walk Chambers

NGOs, charities and pressure groups
Alagappa Alagappan (1925–2014), Indian-born American founder of the Hindu Temple Society of North America
 Shami Chakrabarti, director of Liberty
 Mark Goldring, chief executive of Mencap, chief executive of Oxfam GB
 Dame Elisabeth Hoodless, executive director of Community Service Volunteers (1975–2011)
 Mary Joynson, director of Barnardo's
 Marion Kozak, human rights campaigner
 Temi Mwale, founder of The 4Front Project
 Sir Nicholas Partridge, Chief Executive Terrence Higgins Trust; Chairman of Involve
 Anusyabehn Sarabhai, Indian trade unionist
 Salil Shetty, Secretary General of Amnesty International
 Barbara Davies, former national organizer of Christian CND

Sport
 Josh Chetwynd, baseball player, presenter and author
 John Lacy, English footballer, 1975 FA Cup finalist with Fulham
 Marcus Mepstead, Men's Foil Team, Rio 2016 Olympics
 Folarin Ogunsola, Gambian national swimmer
 Elham Al Qasimi, first Arab woman to reach the North Pole
 Andy Ripley, British Lions Rugby International
 Val Venis, wrestler

Others
 Jonathan Bartley, former co-leader of the Green Party of England and Wales
 Penelope Meredith Mary Knatchbull, Countess Mountbatten of Burma
 Arnold Cook, founder of the Guide Dog movement
 Joseph P. Kennedy Jr., American naval officer and brother of US president John F. Kennedy, died in WWII
 Ralph Lazar, artist
 Ilich Ramírez Sánchez aka Carlos the Jackal, terrorist
 Ahmed Omar Saeed Sheikh, Islamic militant

Fictional
 President Josiah Bartlet, fictional President of the United States on NBC's popular TV show The West Wing
 Andrew Bond, fictional father of James Bond, 007
 Eliza Doolittle, fictional character in Pygmalion by George Bernard Shaw
 Prime Minister Jim Hacker of Yes Minister and Yes, Prime Minister
 Guy MacKendrick, a British accounts executive in Mad Men
 Jack Ryan, fictional character by Tom Clancy who appears in many of his novels and their respective film adaptations
Arthur Edwards, main antagonist of the Hitman (2016 - 2021) game series.

Founders of LSE
First the four generally accepted co-founders:

 Sidney Webb
 George Bernard Shaw
 Beatrice Webb, also Governor, LSE, 1901-1928
 Graham Wallas

The original governors of the LSE were, besides Beatrice Webb:
 Jervoise Athelstane Baines, Governor, LSE, 1901-1926
 Hubert Bland, Governor, LSE, 1901-1914
 William Garnett, mathematical physicist and educational administrator, Governor, LSE, 1901-1932
 Robert Giffen, Governor, LSE, 1901-1910
 Courtenay Ilbert, Governor, LSE, 1901-1923
 Richard Burdon Haldane, Liberal politician, lawyer, and philosopher, Governor, LSE, 1901-1907
 Alfred Lyall, Governor, LSE, 1901-1911
 Joseph Francis Oakeshott, Governor, LSE, 1901-1945
 Edward R. Pease, Governor, LSE, 1901-1945
 William Pember Reeves, Governor, LSE, 1901-1908
 Lionel Walter Rothschild, Governor, LSE, 1901-1929
 Bertrand Russell, Governor, LSE, 1901-1906
 Herbert L Samuel, Governor, LSE, 1901-1945
 Charlotte Shaw, Governor, LSE, 1901-1922
 Frederick Whelan, Governor, LSE, 1901-1945
 Edward Arthur Whittuck, Governor, LSE, 1901-1924

References

Further reading
 LSE Press and Information Office - World leaders
 LSE Press and Information Office - Nobel Prize winners

London School of Economics
People associated with the London School of Economics